The 2023 California wildfire season is a series of wildfires burning in the U.S. state of California. No wildfire fatalities have been recorded, nor any destruction of buildings. The 2023 fire season follows the 2022 season, in which a below-average number of fires burned an also-below-average acreage, owing in part to fortunate weather patterns.

Season outlook

Climatic conditions 
California saw a series of powerful atmospheric rivers in the first weeks of January, which much improved drought conditions in the state and boosted the snowpack in the Sierra Nevada to more than 200% of average for the date and near-normal for peak snowpack (usually achieved around April 1). Some researchers have noted that the resulting vegetation growth could prove dangerous if dry and warm conditions return during spring and summer, obviating the gains from early storms, but in general, according to the California Department of Forestry and Fire Protection (Cal Fire), increased precipitation reduces the risk of a worse wildfire season.

In the meantime, Cal Fire predicts that "critically dry fuel moisture alignments are not likely to be reached for any great length of time or over a larger area" between January and April 2023. Critical fuel moisture refers to the point at which fuel characteristics—like vegetation mortality or dryness—are favorable for large fire growth. Seasonal forecasts are inconclusive regarding continued high levels of precipitation in the state as a rare third annual La Niña gives way to neutral or perhaps El Niño conditions.

Preparation 
On January 19, U.S. Agriculture Secretary Tom Vilsack announced the allocation of $930 million in funding from the Infrastructure Investment and Jobs Act and the Inflation Reduction Act to ten western states, including California, for fuel reduction programs and other measures to curtail wildfire risks. The allocation was reported to represent a significant increase in funding for programs like tree clearing, brush thinning and removal, and controlled burns in Southern California, whose four National Forests previously received about $1.2 million annually for those purposes.

On January 31, California senators Dianne Feinstein and Alex Padilla (as well as senators Steve Daines of Montana and Ron Wyden of Oregon) introduced a bill to the U.S. Senate entitled the Wildfire Emergency Act, recognizing the "threat of wildfire" as an emergency in the Western United States. The proposed bill would span multiple issues: it would provide at least a quarter of a billion dollars in funding for forest restoration and wildfire resilience in 20 locations of more than  each, coordinated by the Forest Service. It would also create a program at the Department of Energy to "ensure that critical facilities remain active during wildfire disruptions" (as power shutoffs have become an increasingly common method of reducing wildfire ignition risk for utilities). Further funding would be provided for prescribed fire implementation, firefighter training, and wildfire detection.

Timing of peak fire season 
In Northern California, fire season typically peaks in the summer with increasingly warm and dry conditions and aided by occasional dry cold frontal passages that may bring winds and/or lightning. Activity usually continues until late fall brings Pacific moisture to the northern portion of the state, though northeast wind events may pose a threat. In Southern California, fire season typically peaks in late spring through early fall, when Pacific moisture recedes. Offshore wind events such as Santa Ana winds mean that large fires are possible year-round, but their frequency is most heightened in the fall, when fuels are also driest.

List of wildfires 
Acreage and containment figures may not be up to date.

See also 

 List of California wildfires

References

External links 
 Cal Fire 2023 Incidents Overview page

California, 2023
2023